Cooperoceras is a genus of Tainoceratid nautiloid cephalopod molluscs within the superfamily Tainocerataceae, characterized by and evolute shell with an open, perforate, umbilicus, sinuous ribs at maturity, and recurved hollow spines along the ventro-lateral shoulders. The flanks and venter are flattened, the flanks converge on the dorsum, the venter has a shallow median groove. The suture is with  rounded ventral and lateral lobes. The siphuncle is small, tubular, and subcentral. (Kummel 1964, K413)

Cooperoceras, known from the Lower Permian of N America and Europe (Urals), was named by Miller in 1945. The genotype is Cooperoceras texanum.

The phylogenetic relationships of Cooperoceras are unclear.

References

 Kummel,B. 1964, Nauiloidea-Nautilida, in The Treatise on Invertebrate Paleontology, Part K, Nautiloidea; Geological Society of America and University of Kansas Press.

Prehistoric nautiloid genera
Fossil taxa described in 1945
Permian cephalopods